Jaipatna is a town in the Kalahandi District in Odisha State. It is surrounded by the Eastern Ghatsrange.

External links 
 Jaipatna Block office

Cities and towns in Kalahandi district